Costa Group is Australia's largest horticultural company and a major supplier of produce to food retailers in that country. The company had an IPO in 2015 and was officially listed on the Australian Stock Exchange as  Costa Group Holdings Limited on 24 July 2015 with the ticker symbol CGC.

Operations 

Costa Group grows most of its produce at its own farms and greenhouses. Divisions include:
 Produce: berries, mushrooms, tomatoes, citrus fruit
 International: grows proprietary varieties of blueberries for international markets
 Costa Farms and Logistics: Responsible for logistics and wholesaling, as well as banana farming and marketing

History
Costa has undergone significant changes and growth since its origins in a family-owned fruit shop that was founded in Geelong, Victoria in 1888. Today, the Costa Group stands as Australia's largest horticultural company with diversified operations across the supply chain from farming and packing to marketing and distribution. While Costa still retains its family roots, the Costa family entered into a strategic partnership with Paine + Partners in 2011 to support further growth and development of Costa. The company floated on the Australian Securities Exchange in July 2015.

Since 2011, Costa has been undertaking a strategic transformation program focused on increasing its scale and vertical integration within its portfolio and reinvesting in the business to refresh core assets and fund growth. Expansion initiatives have included the development of the berry and sweet snacking tomato categories organically, the acquisition of Adelaide Mushrooms (a mushroom producer with operations in South Australia and Tasmania) and additions to its citrus footprint through the entry into long-term leases of ex-Timbercorp orchards in 2011. In addition, the formation of the African Blue JV in Morocco in 2007 and the entry in 2014 into a memorandum of understanding (MOU) with Driscoll's for the formation of a farming joint venture in China have enabled Costa to grow its international interests. In connection with this strategic transformation program, Costa has exited categories such as leafy vegetables, potatoes and stone fruit, as well as downsized non-core operations including table grapes, bananas and logistics.

See also 
 Frank Costa

References

Horticultural companies of Australia
Companies listed on the Australian Securities Exchange